Chan Chia Fong (born 24 December 1976) is a Malaysian badminton player. Chan won a bronze medal in girls' doubles with Norhasikin Amin at 1994 World Junior Badminton Championships. She also competed in women's singles at the 1996 Summer Olympics in Atlanta.

References

External links

1976 births
Living people
Malaysian female badminton players
Olympic badminton players of Malaysia
Badminton players at the 1996 Summer Olympics
Malaysian sportspeople of Chinese descent
21st-century Malaysian women